Marion Juliet Mitchell (September 4, 1836 – January 30, 1917) was an American poet and educator. She received a thorough education, and inherited literary tastes from her parents. She contributed extensively both prose and verse to magazines and was the author of a volume of poems. Her poems appeared in several standard collections. Mitchell died in 1917.

Biography
Marion Juliet Mitchell was born in Buffalo, New York, September 4, 1836. Her father, Dr. John Mitchell, died in 1885), and her mother died in 1888. She went with her parents to Wisconsin, and the family settled in Janesville, Wisconsin, which was then a small village. One of the best of her earlier poems, "My Grandmother's Home," is a memorial of several happy years which she passed in childhood with her grandparents, Hon. Isaac Lacey and wife, near Rochester, New York.

She attended school in Rochester, and went afterwards to the Ingham Collegiate Institute (later named Ingham University), in Le Roy, New York. She finished with a thorough course at the Emma Willard School, in Troy, New York.

Mitchell inherited literary tastes from her parents. Most of her poetic work shows matured powers of imagination and expression. Quiet and domestic in her tastes, she cared little for what was generally termed society. She was surrounded by a circle of congenial friends, and her life was passed in good works and the reading of literature. The Mitchell Book of Poems was brought out by Mitchell and her father.

Marion Juliet Mitchell died January 30, 1917, in Janesville, Wisconsin, and was buried in that city's Oak Hill Cemetery.

References

Attribution

External links
 
 
 Marion Juliet Mitchell's poetry at The Magazine of Poetry and Literary Review
 Marion Juliet Mitchell's poetry at The Poetical Works
 Marion Juliet Mitchell's poetry at Under Both Flags: A Panorama of the Great Civil War as Represented in Story

1836 births
1917 deaths
19th-century American poets
19th-century American women writers
Writers from Buffalo, New York
American women poets
People from Janesville, Wisconsin
Wikipedia articles incorporating text from A Woman of the Century
Emma Willard School alumni